Goombala Road is a major throughway within Tarra-Bulga National Park in South Gippsland, Australia. It runs the inside border of the park.   It roughly parallels Traralgon Creek.

A recent program has provided time-lapse photo monitoring on Goombala Road to track changes in the ecosystem.  A camera has been placed at the intersection of Goombala Road and Grand Ridge Road.

See also

References

Gippsland (region)
Roads in Victoria (Australia)